Amy Fadhli (born January 30, 1965) is an American fitness model, actress and winner of the Fitness America National Champion 1996. Her father is Iraqi who was born in Baghdad, a cardiovascular surgeon, and her mother is Czech, a sculptor and breeder of Arabian horses.

Life and career
She is a qualified dental hygienist and after graduating from college, she moved to Northern California, where she first encountered serious fitness training. However, she eventually moved to Dallas and started swimsuit modeling and competing in bikini contests in which she won several swimsuit titles and many prizes including money and trips.
She then decided to continue in pursuing her career in modelling, so she submitted her photo and resume to the promoter of the Fitness America Pageant and she was then invited to compete in the National Championships that year. She managed to win the physique round, but only came in ninth overall in the pageant.
After enjoying competing in the first year, she competed again in the following year, and finished as first runner up, and soon she became the Fitness America National Champion in 1996.

Besides being a fitness model, she is also an actress and has made appearances in many television shows such as The Young and the Restless and numerous films. Her career has enabled her to travel the world, she has been to places such as Hong Kong, Italy, Germany, Mexico, Guam, Spain, Hungary, Slovakia, Malaysia, Jamaica and Lebanon.

Filmography
 The Lobo Paramilitary Christmas Special (2002)
 The Scorpion King (2002)
 Con Games (2001)
 Heaven & the Suicide King (1998)
 Knock-Off (1998)
 The Devil's Child (1997)

Trivia

 Fadhli appeared in the August 1996 issue of Playboy magazine
 She has three siblings, one of which is a twin brother
 Fadhli lived in the Middle East at one time for about a year

Quotes

 "If you couldn't tell, I'm not a natural blonde".
"I got my implants when I was 18. I got them for myself because I wanted them not for anybody or anything else."

References

External links

Amy Fadhli Biography
Amy Fadhli at PerfectPeople.net
Amy Fadhli at American Curves Mag

Living people
1966 births
Female models from Texas
20th-century American actresses
21st-century American actresses
American people of Czech descent
American people of Iraqi descent
Fitness and figure competitors
Actresses from Texas